Damon Krukowski (born September 6, 1963) is an American musician, poet and writer. He was a member of the dreampop band Galaxie 500 and the psychedelic rock band Magic Hour, and is half of the psychedelic folk duo Damon and Naomi. He is also a published poet and writer.

Music
Krukowski was the drummer with the dreampop band Galaxie 500 on all their recordings from 1987 until their split in 1991. He has also recorded three albums and toured with the psychedelic rock band Magic Hour. Since Galaxie 500's split he has worked as duo with his partner Naomi Yang as Damon and Naomi.

Publishing
In 1989 Krukowski and his partner set up the independent book publisher Exact Change who specialise in publishing 19th and 20th century avant-garde literature.

Writing and journalism
Krukowski has written poetry and prose works as well as writing extensively on music, sound and the music industry for Pitchfork and has had books on the subject published.

 5000 Musical Terms (1995, Burning Deck Press )
 The Memory Theater Burned (2005, Turtle Point Press )
 Afterimage (2011, Ugly Duckling Presse )
 The New Analog: Listening and Reconnecting in a Digital World (US: 2017, The New Press )
 The New Analog: Listening and Reconnecting in a Digital World (UK: 2017, MIT Press )
 The New Analog: Como escuchar y reconectarnos con el mundo digita (Spain: 2017, Ediciones Alpha Decay )
 Ways of Hearing (2019, MIT Press )
 Ascoltare il rumore. La riscoperta dell'analogico nell'era della musica digitale (Italy: 2019, BigSur )

In 2017 he wrote and presented the six part Radiotopia podcast Ways of Hearing.

Personal life
Krukowski was educated at Harvard where he studied social theory as an undergraduate and earned an AM in English and American literature. He has taught writing, sound, and writing about sound in Harvard's Writing Program, and studio art department.

Krukowski is married to fellow musician Naomi Yang and they live in Cambridge, Massachusetts.

References

External links 
 Damon Krukowski official website
 Damon & Naomi official website

1963 births
Living people
American male pop singers
American male drummers
American pop guitarists
American folk musicians
American male poets
Harvard University alumni